Chandi Prasad Bhatt (born 23 June 1934) is an Indian Gandhian environmentalist and social activist, who founded Dasholi Gram Swarajya Sangh (DGSS) in Gopeshwar in 1964, which later became a mother-organization to the Chipko Movement, in which he was one of the pioneers, and for which he was awarded the Ramon Magsaysay Award for Community Leadership in 1982, followed by the Padma Bhushan in 2005.

 Today he is known for his work on subaltern social ecology, and considered one of India's first modern environmentalist.

 In 2013, he was the recipient of the Gandhi Peace Prize.

Early life 
Chandi Prasad Bhatt was born on 23 June 1934, as the second child of Ganga Ram Bhatt and Maheshi Devi Thapliyal, in a family of priests to the Rudranath Temple in Gopeshwar, one of the Panch Kedar, the five Himalayan temples dedicated to Shiva, the most venerated amongst them being the Kedarnath Temple. His father, who was a farmer as well as a priest at the famous Shiva temple at Gopeshwar and the  Rudranath temple, died when Chandi Prasad was still an infant and he was raised thereafter by his mother, in Gopeshwar, Chamoli District of Uttarakhand in India, which was then still a very small village. He did his schooling in Rudraprayag and Pauri, but stopped before he could receive a degree.

Career
Farmland was scarce in the overpopulated mountains, and so were jobs. Like most men of the mountain villages, Chandi Prasad taught art to children for a year to support his mother, before eventually forced to work in the plains. He joined the Garhwal Motor Owners Union (GMOU) as a booking clerk, posted at various places including, Rishikesh, Pipalkoti and Karnaprayag.

In 1956, Bhatt found hope when he heard a speech by the Gandhian leader Jayaprakash Narayan, who was on a tour of the area. Bhatt and other young people launched themselves into the Sarvodaya movement and Gandhian campaigns, of Bhoodan and Gramdan and organising villages for economic development and fighting liquor abuse throughout the Uttarakhand.

In 1960, he left his job at GMOU, to commit full-time to his Sarvodaya activities, and by 1964, Bhatt had instituted the Dasholi Gram Swarajya Mandal (Society for Village Self-Rule) to organise fellow villagers in Gopeshwar for employment near their homes in forest-based industries, making wooden implements from ash trees and gathering and marketing herbs for ayurvedic medicine-and to combat vice and exploitation.

Curtailment of the villagers' legitimate rights to trees and forest products in favour of outside commercial interests enabled Bhatt, in 1973, to mobilise the forest-wise society members and villagers into the collective Chipko Andolan (Hug the Trees Movement) to force revision of forest policies dating from 1917. Women, who regularly walk three to five miles to the forest to gather and carry home fuel and fodder on their backs, took the lead. True to the movement's non-violent philosophy, these women embraced the trees to restrict their felling. Establishment of "eco-development camps" brought villagers together to discuss their needs within the context of the ecological balance of the forest. Stabilizing slopes by building rock retaining walls, the campers planted trees started in their own village nurseries. While less than one-third of the trees set out by government foresters survived, up to 88 percent of the villager-planted trees grew.

In 1974 he and his colleagues led a movement to save the cultural and archaeological heritage of the Badrinath shrine.

Bhatt and his society colleagues have been helped by sympathetic scientists, officials and college students. Yet theirs is essentially an indigenous movement of mountain villagers, and Chipko Andolan has become an instrument of action and education for members, officials and outsiders, in the realities of effective resource conservation.

Although Bhatt has attended meetings in lowland India and abroad as a spokesman for Chipko, he has remained a man of his community. He and his wife continue to live the simple life of their Himalayan neighbours. In the process he has become knowledgeable and productive in helping ensure his peoples' hard won living. In 2003, he was appointed a member of the 'National Forest Commission', which reviewed all existing policies and legal frameworks relating to forest management, and submitted its report to the Government in 2005.

Publications
(Selected Books)

 Parvat Parvat, Basti Basti — Publisher NBT India
 Pratikar Ke Ankur (Hindi)
 Adhure Gyan Aur Kalpanik Vishwas Par Himalaya Se Chherkhani Ghatak (Hindi)
 Future of Large Projects in the Himalaya
 Eco-system of Central Himalaya
 Chipko Experience

Awards and honours
2018: Indira Gandhi award for national integration 2018
UNDP Global 500
Ramon Magsaysay Award for Community Leadership 1982
Padma Shri 1986 
govind ballabh pant Vishwavidyalaya dwara dr of science ki upadhi
Padma Bhushan 2005 
 2013: Awarded Gandhi Peace Prize for the year 2013 on 15 July 2014 by The President of India
2016:Sri Sathya Sai Award for human excellence 2016 in the category Environment by Sri Sathya Sai Lok Seva Trust

References 

Citation for the 1982 Ramon Magsaysay Award for Community Leadership

External links 
 "A Gandhian in Garhwal" by Ramachandra Guha, The Hindu, 2 June 2002
Hug the Trees! by Mark Shepard
Citation for the 1982 Ramon Magsaysay Award for Community Leadership and response
Website of the Nanda Devi Campaign, the successor to the Chipko Movement
The Chipko Movement

1934 births
Living people
Gandhians
Indian conservationists
Ramon Magsaysay Award winners
Recipients of the Padma Shri in social work
Recipients of the Padma Bhushan in other fields
Recipients of the Gandhi Peace Prize
People from Chamoli district
Social workers
Members of the Planning Commission of India
Social workers from Uttarakhand